Death of a Salesman is a 1985 American made-for-television film adaptation of the 1949 play of the same name by Arthur Miller, directed by Volker Schlöndorff, starring Dustin Hoffman, Kate Reid, John Malkovich, Stephen Lang and Charles Durning.  The film follows the script of the 1949 play with only minor differences and originally premiered on CBS on September 15, 1985. The film earned 10 Emmy nominations at the 38th Primetime Emmy Awards ceremony and four Golden Globe nominations at the 43rd Golden Globe Awards ceremony, winning three and one, respectively.

Plot
Willy Loman returns home exhausted after a canceled business trip.  Worried over Willy's state of mind and recent car crash, his wife Linda suggests that he asks his boss Howard Wagner to allow him to work in his home city so he will not have to travel.  Willy complains to Linda that their son Biff, who is visiting, has yet to make good on his life.  Despite Biff's promise as an athlete in high school, he flunked senior year math and never went to college.

Willy is prone to frequent flashbacks in which he sees events and figures from his past, such as his long-deceased older brother Ben, Willy's idol.  Unable to distinguish between his memories and present-day reality, he speaks to the people in his flashbacks as if they were real, startling those around him.  Biff and his brother Happy, who is also visiting, discuss their father's mental degradation while reminiscing about their childhood together.  When Willy walks in, angry that the two boys have never amounted to anything, Biff and Happy tell Willy that Biff plans to make a business proposition the next day in an effort to pacify their father.

The next day, Willy goes to ask Howard for a job in town while Biff goes to make a business proposition, but neither are successful.  Willy gets angry and ends up getting fired when Howard tells him that he needs a rest and can no longer represent the company.  Biff waits hours to see a former employer who does not remember him and turns him down.  Biff impulsively steals a fountain pen.  Willy then goes to the office of his neighbor, Charley, where he runs into Charley's son Bernard (now a successful lawyer).  Bernard tells him that Biff originally intended to go to summer school to salvage his academic and athletic career after flunking math, but when Biff made an emergency trip to Boston to seek help from Willy, who was then on a sales trip, something occurred there that changed Biff's mind.

Happy, Biff, and Willy meet for dinner at a restaurant, but Willy refuses to hear bad news from Biff.  Happy tries to get Biff to lie to their father.  Biff tries to tell him what happened as Willy gets angry and slips into a flashback of what happened in Boston the day Biff came to see him.  Willy had been in a hotel on a sales trip with a young woman named Miss Francis when Biff unexpectedly arrived and realized that Willy was cheating on Linda.  From that moment, Biff's view of his father and all of his father's cherished hopes and dreams for him changed irrevocably, setting Biff adrift.

Biff leaves the restaurant in frustration, followed by Happy and two girls, Miss Forsythe and Letta, that Happy has picked up.  They leave a confused and upset Willy behind in the restaurant.  When they later return home, their mother angrily confronts them for abandoning their father while Willy remains talking to himself outside.  Biff goes outside to try to reconcile with Willy.  The discussion quickly escalates into another argument, at which point Biff forcefully tries to convey to his father that he is not meant for anything great, that he is simply ordinary, insisting that they both are.  The feud culminates with Biff hugging Willy and crying as he tries to get him to let go of the unrealistic dreams that he still carries for Biff and wants instead for Willy to accept him for who he really is.  He tells his father he loves him.

Rather than listen to what Biff actually says, Willy realizes that his son has forgiven him and thinks that Biff will now pursue a career as a businessman.  Willy—with encouragement from Ben, whom he "sees" and speaks to in one of his flashbacks—kills himself by intentionally crashing his car so that Biff can use the life insurance money to start his business.  However, at the funeral, Biff retains his belief that he does not want to become a businessman.  Happy, on the other hand, chooses to follow in his father's footsteps.

Cast
 William "Willy" Loman (Dustin Hoffman): A self-deluded traveling salesman. 
 Biff Loman (John Malkovich): Willy’s older son.
 Linda Loman (Kate Reid): Willy's loyal and loving wife. 
 Harold "Happy" Loman (Stephen Lang): Willy's younger son. 
 Charley (Charles Durning): Willy's wisecracking yet understanding neighbor. 
 Bernard (David S. Chandler): Charley's son. 
 Ben Loman (Louis Zorich): Willy's older brother who became a diamond tycoon after a diversion in Africa. 
 Woman from Boston (Kathryn Rossetter, as Kathy Rossetter): A woman with whom Willy cheated on Linda.
 Howard Wagner (Jon Polito): Willy's considerably younger boss.
 Jenny (Anne McIntosh): Charley's secretary.
 Stanley (Tom Signorelli): A waiter at the restaurant who seems to be friends or acquainted with Happy.
 Miss Forsythe (Linda Kozlowski): A girl whom Happy picks up at the restaurant. 
 Letta (Karen Needle): Miss Forsythe's friend.
 Waiter (Michael Quinlan)

Reception
On review aggregation website Rotten Tomatoes, 100% of 8 reviews are positive, with an average rating of 8.4 out of 10.

Home media
The film was released on DVD on January 28, 2003 by Image Entertainment.  A Blu-ray Disc edition by Shout! Factory was released on November 15, 2016.

Awards and nominations
 Won: 1986 Golden Globe Award for Best Actor in a Miniseries or Motion Picture Made for Television (Dustin Hoffman)
 Won: 1986 Primetime Emmy Award for Outstanding Art Direction for a Miniseries or a Special (Robert J. Franco, John Kasarda, and Tony Walton)
 Won: 1986 Primetime Emmy Award for Outstanding Lead Actor in a Miniseries or a Special (Dustin Hoffman)
 Won: 1986 Primetime Emmy Award for Outstanding Supporting Actor in a Miniseries or a Special (John Malkovich)
 Nominated: 1986 Golden Globe Award for Best Miniseries or Motion Picture Made for Television
 Nominated: 1986 Golden Globe Award for Best Actor in a Supporting Role in a Series, Miniseries or Motion Picture Made for Television (John Malkovich)
 Nominated: 1986 Golden Globe Award for Best Actress in a Supporting Role in a Series, Miniseries or Motion Picture Made for Television (Kate Reid)
 Nominated: 1986 Primetime Emmy Award for Outstanding Directing in a Miniseries or a Special (Volker Schlöndorff)
 Nominated: 1986 Primetime Emmy Award for Outstanding Music Composition for a Miniseries or a Special (Dramatic Underscore) (Alex North)
 Nominated: 1986 Primetime Emmy Award for Outstanding Costume Design for a Miniseries or a Special (Ruth Morley)
 Nominated: 1986 Primetime Emmy Award for Outstanding Drama/Comedy Special (Robert F. Colesberry, Dustin Hoffman, and Arthur Miller)
 Nominated: 1986 Primetime Emmy Award for Outstanding Sound Mixing for a Miniseries or a Special (Tom Fleischman) 
 Nominated: 1986 Primetime Emmy Award for Outstanding Editing for a Miniseries or a Special - Single Camera Production {David Ray)
 Nominated: 1986 Primetime Emmy Award for Outstanding Supporting Actor in a Miniseries or a Special (Charles Durning)

References

External links
 
 
 

1985 television films
1985 films
1985 drama films
CBS network films
Films directed by Volker Schlöndorff
Films set in Brooklyn
Films shot in New York City
American films based on plays
Films with screenplays by Arthur Miller
Filmed stage productions
1980s English-language films
Films set in the 1940s
Films about salespeople